The Dollar-a-Year Man is a 1921 American comedy film starring Fatty Arbuckle. It is not known whether the film currently survives, which suggests that it is a lost film.

Plot
Based upon a summary in a film publication, Franklin Pinney (Arbuckle) is a member of the Yacht Club which is hosting a Prince at a dinner. Fearing that Franklin, who is not a blue blooded member, will commit some indiscretion, the members plan to have Kate Connelly (Greenwood), the club detective, lure him to a haunted house until after the ceremony. Tipson Blair (Dumont) has plans to kidnap the Prince and keep him prisoner at the haunted house. Kate gets Franklin to the haunted house, but a fight breaks out with the gang that is waiting for the Prince. Meanwhile, the Prince is playing hooky from the dinner and is out driving around with Peggy Bruce (Lee), whom Franklin loves. Out of curiosity they stop by the haunted house in time for the fight between Franklin and the gang. Members of the royal party arrive to save the Prince, and Franklin as the hero of the fight wins Peggy.

Cast
 Roscoe 'Fatty' Arbuckle as Franklin Pinney
 Lila Lee as Peggy Bruce
 Winifred Greenwood as Kate Connelly
 J.M. Dumont as Tipson Blair
 A. Edward Sutherland as The Prince (as Edward Sutherland)
 Edwin Stevens as Colonel Bruce
 Henry Johnson as General Oberano

See also
 List of American films of 1921
 Fatty Arbuckle filmography

References

External links

1921 films
1921 comedy films
American silent feature films
American black-and-white films
Silent American comedy films
Films directed by James Cruze
Paramount Pictures films
1920s American films